Galveston Island Historic Pleasure Pier is a pleasure pier in Galveston, Texas, United States. Opened in the summer of 2012, it has 1 roller coaster, 15 rides, carnival games and souvenir shops.

History
The new Galveston Island Historic Pleasure Pier was built  out over the Gulf of Mexico waters. It had its "soft" opening on May 25, 2012.

The new pier complex is located where the original Pleasure Pier stood from 1943 until 1961, when it was destroyed by Hurricane Carla. The original Pleasure Pier featured rides, an arcade, an aquarium, concessions, a large ball room, named the Marine Ballroom, and fishing at the end of the pier. It was also the site of the USS Flagship Hotel, an over-the-water hotel built in 1965 that was demolished after Hurricane Ike in 2008.

Before the renovation there had been almost no maintenance in over 70 years, resulting in the pier having exposed reinforcing steel with accelerated corrosion and concrete spalling at piles, beams, joists, and reflective overhead flat plates. Because of this, extensive structural concrete restoration was needed. Repairs were eventually completed using shotcrete struck and finished in alignment with pre-existing materials making up the pier.

The pier was a filming location for the 2021 comedy-drama Red Rocket.
 The pier was also featured in the 2022 animated comedy Beavis and Butt-Head Do the Universe.

Attractions

Features at the Galveston Island Historic Pleasure Pier include:
Sky Shooter — airborne shot ride.
Texas Star Flyer — swinging riders over the water 230 feet above the Gulf.
Galaxy Wheel — a 100-foot-tall Ferris wheel, featuring programmable LED lights.
Bubba Gump Shrimp Company restaurant.

Current Attractions

See also

 2012 in amusement parks

References

External links
Official  Galveston Island Historic Pleasure Pier website

 
Amusement parks in Texas
Piers in Texas
Landry's Restaurants, Inc. amusement parks
Buildings and structures in Galveston, Texas
Galveston Bay Area
Greater Houston
2012 establishments in Texas
Tourist attractions in Galveston, Texas
Amusement parks opened in 2012